Scoloplos is a genus of annelids belonging to the family Orbiniidae.

The genus has cosmopolitan distribution.

The 69 species listed by IRMNG include:
 Scoloplos acmeceps Chamberlin, 1919
 Scoloplos acutissimus Hartmann-Schröder, 1991
 Scoloplos armiger (Müller, 1776)

References

Annelids